The following is a list of events and releases that have happened or are expected to happen in 2022 in music in the United States.

Notable events

January
8 – After a 50-year career, David Lee Roth retired from music following the conclusion of a five-date Las Vegas residency.
14 – Underoath released their first studio album in four years, Voyeurist.
Terry Blade released his second studio album Neo Queer.
16 – Daughtry bassist Josh Paul announced that he was leaving the band after fifteen years. He previously left the band in 2012 and returned the next year.
20 – Singer and actor Meat Loaf died at the age of 74.
21 – Band of Horses released their first studio album in almost six years, Things Are Great.
John Mellencamp released his first studio album in five years, Strictly a One-Eyed Jack.
Aoife O'Donovan released her first studio album in six years, Age of Apathy.

February
4 – Erin Rae released her first studio album in four years Lighten Up.
11 – Mary J. Blige released her first studio album in five years, Good Morning Gorgeous.
Once Human released their first studio album in five years, Scar Weaver.
Amos Lee released his first studio album in four years, Dreamland.
Spoon released their first album in five years, Lucifer on the Sofa.
Joe Nichols released his first studio album in five years, Good Day for Living.
13 – Mickey Guyton performed the National Anthem, and  Dr. Dre, Snoop Dogg, Eminem, Mary J. Blige, and Kendrick Lamar  performed the halftime show during Super Bowl LVI at SoFi Stadium in Inglewood, California.
18 – Beach House released their first studio album in four years, Once Twice Melody.
Hurray for the Riff Raff released their first studio album in five years, Life on Earth.
25 – Dashboard Confessional released their first studio album in four years, All the Truth That I Can Tell.

March
4 – Dolly Parton released her first studio album of original material in five years, Run, Rose, Run.
 Danielle Bradbery released her first studio album in five years, In Between: The Collection.
Crowbar released their first studio album in six years, Zero and Below.
6 – The Industrial Strength Tour, featuring Ministry, Melvins and Corrosion of Conformity, began at Baltimore Soundstage in Baltimore, Maryland; the tour was initially scheduled to take place in the summer of 2020 but was postponed to spring 2021, then to fall, both due to the COVID-19 pandemic, and later to its current date.
7– The 57th Academy of Country Music Awards took place at Allegiant Stadium in Las Vegas. This was the first time in fifty years the show did not air on broadcast television. It was instead streamed on Prime Video.
18 – Stabbing Westward released their first studio album in 21 years, Chasing Ghosts.
25 – Longtime Foo Fighters drummer Taylor Hawkins was found dead in his hotel room in Bogotá, Colombia, where the band was scheduled to play a show that night. He was 50 years old.

April
1 – Red Hot Chili Peppers released their first studio album in six years, Unlimited Love. It was also their first album to feature guitarist John Frusciante since their 2006 album, Stadium Arcadium.
 The Color Fred released their first studio album in nearly 15 years, A Year and Change.
3 – The 64th Annual Grammy Awards took place at the MGM Grand Garden Arena in Las Vegas. Jon Batiste won the most awards with five including Album of the Year with We Are.
8 – Josh Tillman, as Father John Misty, released his first album in four years, Chloë and the Next 20th Century.
 Cole Swindell released his first studio album in four years, Stereotype.
 Jack White released his first solo studio album in four years, Fear of the Dawn.
11 – The CMT Music Awards took place in Nashville, Tennessee. 
22 – Bonnie Raitt released her first studio album in six years, Just Like That....
Dorothy released their first studio album in four years, Gifts from the Holy Ghost.
29 – Ted Nugent released his first studio album in four years, Detroit Muscle.
30 – Country singer Naomi Judd died at the age of 76.

May
6 – Halestorm released their first studio album in four years, Back from the Dead.
 Fozzy released their first studio album in five years, Boombox.
 Timothy B. Schmit released his first studio album in over five years, Day by Day.
9 – AleXa of Oklahoma won the first ever American Song Contest with the song "Wonderland".
13 – Kendrick Lamar released his first studio album in five years, Mr. Morale & the Big Steppers.
15 – The 2022 Billboard Music Awards took place at the MGM Grand Garden Arena in Las Vegas.
20 – Train released their first studio album in five years, AM Gold.
22 – Noah Thompson won the twentieth season of American Idol. HunterGirl was named runner-up.

June
3 – Gwar released their first studio album in five years, The New Dark Ages.
4 – Bon Jovi co-founder and original bassist Alec John Such died at the age of 70.
10 – Carrie Underwood released her first studio album of all original material in four years, Denim & Rhinestones.
17 − Dan Reed Network released their first studio album in four years, Let's Hear It For The King.
20 – Due to internal struggles between himself and the band, Live fired its co-founder and lead guitarist, Chad Taylor. Later in the year, it was confirmed by former lead singer Chris Shinn that Patrick Dahlheimer and Chad Gracey were also fired from Live, leaving singer Ed Kowalczyk as the only founding member still in the band.
24 – Coheed and Cambria released their first studio album in four years, Vaxis – Act II: A Window of the Waking Mind.
 Jack Johnson released his first studio album in five years, Meet the Moonlight.
 Lupe Fiasco released his first studio album in four years, Drill Music in Zion.
 Regina Spektor released her first studio album in six years, Home, Before and After.

July
1 − Municipal Waste released their first studio album in five years, Electrified Brain.
 Shinedown released their first studio album in four years, Planet Zero.
8 – Journey released their first studio album in eleven years, Freedom.
15 − Interpol released their first studio album in four years, The Other Side of Make-Believe.
 Senses Fail released their first studio album in four years, Hell Is in Your Head.
 Travie McCoy released his first solo studio album in twelve years, Never Slept Better.
22 − Palisades released their first studio album in four years, Reaching Hypercritical.
 Joey Badass released his first studio album in five years, 2000.
 Odesza released their first non-collaborative studio album in five years, The Last Goodbye.
29 − Beyoncé released her first studio album in six years, Renaissance.
 Unwritten Law released their first studio album in eleven years, The Hum. It was the band's first studio album in 20 years to feature original drummer Wade Youman, with his last studio album being 2002's Elva.

August
5 – The Interrupters released their first studio album in four years, In the Wild.
19 – TobyMac released his first studio album in four years, Life After Death.
Panic! at the Disco, Brendon Urie's solo project, released its first studio album in four years, Viva Las Vengeance.
26 – Machine Head released their first studio album in four years, Of Kingdom and Crown.
 JID released his first solo studio album in four years, The Forever Story.
 Britney Spears released her first single in six years, "Hold Me Closer", a duet with Elton John.
28 – The MTV Video Music Awards took place at the Prudential Center in Newark, New Jersey. Jack Harlow took home the most awards with four. Taylor Swift won Video of the Year with All Too Well: The Short Film.

September
2 – Megadeth released their first studio album in six years, The Sick, the Dying... and the Dead!.
 King's X released their first studio album in 14 years, Three Sides of One.
9 – Armor for Sleep released their first studio album in 15 years, The Rain Museum.
 Santigold released her first studio album in six years, Spirituals.
Revocation released their first studio album in four years, Netherheaven.
Kane Brown released his first studio album in four years, Different Man.
Flogging Molly released their first studio album in five years, Anthem.
12 – Rapper PnB Rock was fatally shot in Los Angeles at the age of 30.
16 – The Mars Volta released their first studio album in ten years, The Mars Volta.
Death Cab for Cutie released their first studio album in four years, Asphalt Meadows.
Clutch released their first studio album in four years, Sunrise on Slaughter Beach.
LeAnn Rimes released her first studio album of original material in six years, God's Work.
23 – The Wonder Years released their first studio album in four years, The Hum Goes on Forever.
28 – Rapper Coolio was found dead at the age of 59 in Los Angeles.
30 – Yeah Yeah Yeahs released their first studio album in nine years, Cool It Down.
 Off! released their first studio album in eight years, Free LSD.
 Drowning Pool released their first studio  album in six years, Strike a Nerve.

October
4 – Country music legend Loretta Lynn died at the age of 90.
7 – Broken Bells released their first studio album in eight years, Into the Blue.
 Charlie Puth released his first studio album in four years, Charlie.
11 – Blink-182 announced that guitarist and co-founder Tom DeLonge has rejoined the band after leaving in 2015; DeLonge subsequently replaced Matt Skiba, who had been his replacement.
14 – Skid Row released their first studio album in sixteen years, The Gang's All Here. It is their first album with new vocalist Erik Grönwall, who replaced ZP Theart in March.
 Nothing More released their first studio album in five years, Spirits.
 Red Hot Chili Peppers released their thirteenth album, Return of the Dream Canteen, just six months after the release of Unlimited Love; the two albums were recorded during the same sessions.
We Came as Romans released their first studio album in five years, Darkbloom.
 28 – Jerry Lee Lewis died at the age of 87.
 Dead Cross released their first studio album in five years, II.
Polyphia released their first studio album in four years, Remember That You Will Die.

November
1 – Rapper Takeoff of Migos was shot dead at a bowling alley in Houston, Texas at the age of 28.
4 – The Welcome Wagon released their first studio album in five years, Esther.
7 – Flyleaf announced the return of original lead vocalist Lacey Sturm, who had left following the recording of 2012's New Horizons. The band also announced that they would now be known as "Flyleaf with Lacey Sturm".
9 – The 56th Annual CMA Awards took place at the Bridgestone Arena in Nashville, Tennessee.
11 – Chelsea Grin released their first studio album in four years, Suffer in Hell, the first half of a double album. The second half, Suffer in Heaven, will be released in March 2023.
15 – The Smashing Pumpkins released act one (out of three) of a rock opera album called Atum, which serves as a sequel to previous albums Mellon Collie and the Infinite Sadness (1995) and Machina/The Machines of God (2000). Act two is due for release on January 31, 2023, with the full album set for release on April 21, 2023.
18 – Disturbed released their first studio album in four years, Divisive.
20 – The American Music Awards took place at the Microsoft Theater in Los Angeles.
25 – Leather released her first studio album in four years, We Are the Chosen.

December
2 – Neal Casal re-released his 1996 album, Rain Wind and Speed.
 Hammers of Misfortune released their first studio album in six years, Overtaker.
9 – Lionheart released their first album in five years, Welcome to the West Coast III, a sequel to 2017's Welcome to the West Coast II.
SZA released her first album in five years, SOS.
13 – Bryce Leatherwood was crowned the winner of the twenty-second season of The Voice, bodie was runner-up. Morgan Myles, Omar Jose Cardona, and Brayden Lape finished in third, fourth, and fifth place respectively.
16 – Ab-Soul released his first studio album in six years, Herbert.
 Nostalghia released her first studio album in four years, Wounds.
 Tiffany released her first studio album in four years, Shadows.
 While going on indefinite hiatus, Circa Survive released their first studio album in five years, Two Dreams.

Bands formed
L.S. Dunes

Bands reformed
Coal Chamber
Flyleaf
The Gaslight Anthem
Pantera
She Wants Revenge
Sunny Day Real Estate
Yellowcard

Bands on hiatus
Brockhampton
Circa Survive
Florida Georgia Line
The Neighbourhood

Bands disbanded
Blessthefall
The Detroit Cobras
Every Time I Die
Kids See Ghosts
mewithoutYou
The Mighty Mighty Bosstones
Migos
Neverland Express
Quiet Company
The Sword

Albums released in 2022

January

February

March

April

May

June

July

August

September

October

November

December

Top songs on record

Billboard Hot 100 No. 1 Songs
"About Damn Time" – Lizzo 
"All I Want for Christmas Is You" – Mariah Carey 
"Anti-Hero" – Taylor Swift 
"As It Was" – Harry Styles 
"Bad Habit" – Steve Lacy 
"Break My Soul" – Beyoncé 
"Easy on Me" – Adele 
"First Class" – Jack Harlow 
"Heat Waves" – Glass Animals 
"Jimmy Cooks" – Drake feat. 21 Savage 
"Super Freaky Girl" – Nicki Minaj 
"Unholy" – Sam Smith and Kim Petras 
"Wait for U" – Future feat. Drake and Tems 
"We Don't Talk About Bruno" – Encanto cast

Billboard Hot 100 Top 20 Hits
All songs that reached the Top 20 on the Billboard Hot 100 chart during the year, complete with peak chart placement.

Deaths
January 2 − Traxamillion, 42, hip hop producer
Jay Weaver, 42, Christian rock bassist
January 4 − Jessie Daniels, 57, R&B singer
January 5 − Dale Clevenger, 81, classical French hornist
January 6 − Calvin Simon, 79, funk singer
January 8 – Marilyn Bergman, 93, songwriter
Michael Lang, 77, tour promoter and producer
January 9 − Maria Ewing, 71, opera singer 
James Mtume, 76, jazz and R&B instrumentalist
January 10 − Gerry Granahan, 89, rock and roll and pop singer
Khan Jamal, 75, jazz vibraphonist
January 11 − Bruce Anderson, 72, experimental guitarist
Rosa Lee Hawkins, 76, pop and R&B singer    
January 12 − Everett Lee, 105, classical violinist and conductor
Ronnie Spector, 78, R&B and pop singer (The Ronettes)
January 13 − CPO Boss Hogg, 52, rapper
Fred Parris, 85, doo-wop musician
Sonny Turner, 83, R&B singer
January 14 − Dallas Frazier, 82, country singer songwriter
Greg Webster, 84, funk drummer
January 15 − Ralph Emery, 88, disc jockey
Jon Lind, 73, folk rock and pop singer songwriter
Rachel Nagy, 37, blues rock singer
January 18 − Dick Halligan, 78, jazz rock multi-instrumentalist 
January 20 – Meat Loaf, 74, rock singer
Tom Smith, 65, experimental rock multi-instrumentalist
January 21 − Terry Tolkin, 62, music journalist and music executive who coined the term Alternative Music
January 22 – Don Wilson, 88, instrumental rock and surf rock musician (The Ventures)
January 23 − Beegie Adair, 84, jazz pianist
January 29 − Sam Lay, 86, blues drummer
January 30 − Philip Paul, 96, jazz blues and R&B drummer
Hargus Robbins, 84, country and rock pianist
January 31 − Jimmy Johnson, 93, blues guitarist  
February 1 – Jon Zazula, 69, music industry executive
February 2 − Willie Leacox, 74, folk rock drummer
Joe Diorio, 85, jazz guitarist
February 6 − Syl Johnson, 85, blues guitarist
George Crumb, 92, classical composer
February 8 − Bruce Greig, 54, death metal guitarist 
February 9 – Betty Davis, 76, funk and soul singer, songwriter
February 11 – Mike Rabon, 78, rock singer and guitarist
February 12 – Howard Grimes, 80, soul drummer
February 13 – King Louie Bankston, 49, power pop singer, songwriter and guitarist
February 14 – Sandy Nelson, 83, rock and roll drummer
Roger Segal, 49, punk rock bassist
February 16 – Bob DeMeo, 66, jazz drummer
February 17 – David Tyson, 62, R&B singer
February 18 – Scotty Wray, 64, country music singer
February 19 – Nightbirde, 31, pop singer
February 20 – Sam Henry, 65, punk rock drummer
February 22 – Mark Lanegan, 57, alternative rock singer songwriter
February 26 − Snootie Wild, 36, rapper
March 1 − Warner Mack, 86, country singer-songwriter
Richard Pratt, R&B singer
March 2 − Chuck Criss, 36, indie-folk musician (Freelance Whales)
March 4 − Jimbeau Hinson, 70, country singer-songwriter
March 5 − Jeff Howell, 60, rock bassist (Outlaws)
March 6 − Mike Cross, 57, alternative rock guitarist
March 8 − 
John Dean, 80, blue-eyed soul singer (The Reflections)
Grandpa Elliott, 77, soul and blues singer
March 9 − Richard Podolor, 86, rock and roll guitarist
March 10 − Bobbie Nelson, 91, country music singer, pianist
March 11 − Brad Martin, 48, country singer
Timmy Thomas, 77, soul singer 
March 12 – Traci Braxton, 50, singer  (The Braxtons)
Barry Bailey, 73, rock guitarist
Jessica Williams, 73, jazz pianist
March 15 – Dennis Gonzalez, 67, free jazz trumpter
Barbara Maier Gustern, 82, vocal coach and jazz singer
March 16 – Barbara Morrison, 72, jazz singer  
Bobby Weinstein, 82, pop songwriter
March 21 − LaShun Pace, 60, gospel singer
March 25 – Taylor Hawkins, 50, drummer, singer (Foo Fighters)
Bobby Hendricks, 84, R&B singer
Keith Martin, 55, R&B singer
March 26 – Jeff Carson, 58, country music singer
Keaton Price, 31, post-hardcore singer
March 30 – Francisco Gonzalez, 68, rock mandolinist and harpist
March 31 – Fred Johnson, 80, doo-wop singer
April 1 – C. W. McCall, 93, country singer
Ronald White, 83, bluegrass mandolinist
April 4 – Joe Messina, 93, R&B guitarist
April 5 – Bobby Rydell, 79, rock and roll singer
Paul Siebel, 83, country rock singer, songwriter, guitarist
April 9 – John Rossi, 79, rock and roll drummer
April 12 – David Reel, 64, indie rock singer and guitarist  
April 13 – Tim Feerick, 34, rock bassist (Dance Gavin Dance)
April 17 – Roderick Clark, 49, R&B singer
Hollis Resnik, 67, musical theater singer and actress
April 18 – Nicholas Angelich, 51, classical pianist
April 20 – Guitar Shorty, 89, blues guitarist
April 25 – Andrew Woolfolk, 71, R&B saxophonist
April 26 – Randy Rand, 62, hard rock bassist
April 27 – Judy Henske, 85, folk singer-songwriter
April 29 – Allen Blairman, 81, jazz drummer  
April 30 – Naomi Judd, 76, country singer-songwriter (The Judds)
Gabe Serbian, 44, hardcore punk guitarist and drummer
May 4 – Howie Pyro, 61, punk rock bassist
May 6 – Jewell, 56, R&B singer
May 7 – Mickey Gilley, 86, country singer-songwriter
May 11 – Trevor Strnad, 41, melodic death metal singer (The Black Dahlia Murder)
May 13 – Lil Keed, 24, rapper
May 18 – Bob Neuwirth, 82, singer songwriter
May 19 – Bernard Wright, 58, jazz funk singer and keyboardist
May 23 – Thom Bresh, 74, country singer
May 29 – Ronnie Hawkins, 87, rock and roll singer
May 30 – Paul Vance, 92, songwriter and record producer
May 31 – Ingram Marshall, 80, classical composer
Kelly Joe Phelps, 62, blues singer songwriter and slide guitarist 
Dave Smith, 72, sound engineer
June 1 − Deborah McCrary, 67, gospel singer (The McCrary Sisters)
June 2 – Hal Bynum, 87, country songwriter
June 4 – Trouble, 34, rapper
Alec John Such, 70, rock bassist (Bon Jovi)
June 6 – Jim Seals, 79, rock singer (Seals and Crofts)
June 9 – Julee Cruise, 65, dream pop singer
June 12 – Gabe Baltazar, 92, jazz saxophonist
June 14 – Joel Whitburn, 82, charts historian
June 19 – Jim Schwall, 79, blues singer songwriter and guitarist
Brett Tuggle, 70, rock keyboardist
June 22 – Patrick Adams, 72, disco arranger and producer
July 7 – Adam Wade, 87, pop singer
July 14 – William Hart, 77, R&B singer (The Delfonics)
July 16 – Idris Phillips, 64, jazz and folk pianist
July 18 – Vincent DeRosa, 101, classical French hornist
July 19 – 
Michael Henderson, 71, singer and bass player
Q Lazzarus, 61, singer
July 24 – Bob Heathcote, 58, crossover thrash bassist 
July 27 – JayDaYoungan, 24, rapper
July 29 – Jim Sohns, 75, rock singer 
July 31 – Mo Ostin, 95, record producer
August 4 – Sam Gooden, 87, soul singer
August 5 – Michael Lang, 80, jazz and classical pianist
August 6 – David Muse, 73, rock musician
August 8 – Lamont Dozier, 81, songwriter and record producer 
August 10 – Abdul Wadud, 75, jazz and classical cellist 
August 11 – Bill Pitman, 102, jazz pop and rock guitarist
August 16 – Kal David, 79, blues singer and guitarist
August 19 – Ted Kirkpatrick, 62, Christian thrash metal drummer and songwriter 
August 21 – Monnette Sudler, 70, jazz guitarist
August 22 – Jerry Allison, 82, rock drummer (The Crickets)
Jaimie Branch, 39, free jazz trumpter and composer
August 25 – Mable John, 91, R&B singer
Joey DeFrancesco, 51, jazz organist saxophonist and trumpter
August 29 – Luke Bell, 32, country singer-songwriter
September 4 – Wes Freed, 58, artist and album cover designer
September 7 – Dave Sherman, 55, doom metal bassist
September 8 – Sonny West, 85, rockabilly singer, songwriter, guitarist
September 9 – Herschel Sizemore, 87, bluegrass mandolinist
September 10 – Jorja Fleezanis, 70, classical violinist
Paulino Bernal, 83, Tex-Mex accordionist
September 12 – PnB Rock, 30, rapper
Ramsey Lewis, 87, jazz pianist and composer
September 13 – Jesse Powell, 51, R&B singer
September 14 – Jim Post, folk singer-songwriter
September 16 – Marva Hicks, 66, soul singer
September 21 – Anton Fier, 66, alternative rock drummer
Ray Edenton, 95, country and rock guitarist
September 22 – John Hartman, 72, rock drummer 
September 24 – Pharoah Sanders, 81, jazz saxophonist
Sue Mingus, 92, record producer
September 26 – Joe Bussard, 86, record collector
September 28 – Coolio, 59, rapper
October 1 – Kevin Locke, 68, folk flautist
October 2 – Mary McCaslin, 75, singer songwriter
October 4 – Loretta Lynn, 90, country music singer, songwriter
October 5 – Lenny Lipton, 82, folk lyricist
October 6 – 
Jody Miller, 80, country music singer
Fred Catero, 89, record producer and engineer
Ivy Jo Hunter, 82, R&B singer
Judy Tenuta, 65, comedy music singer songwriter
October 7 –
Ronnie Cuber, 80, jazz saxophonist
Art Laboe, 97, radio disc jockey
October 8 – Charlie Brown, 80, radio disc jockey
October 9 – Chuck Deardorf, 68, jazz bassist
October 10 – Anita Kerr, 94, country and pop singer and arranger  
October 11 – Willie Spence, 23, R&B singer
October 12 – Monsta O, 56, rapper
October 13 – 
Mike Schank, 56, film composer and guitarist
Joyce Sims, 63, R&B singer
October 15 – Marty Sammon, 45, blues and ragtime keyboardist
October 18 – Robert Gordon, 75, rockabilly singer
October 19 – Joanna Simon, 84, opera singer
October 20 –
Bettye Crutcher, 83, R&B singer
Lucy Simon, 82, composer and folk singer
October 21 – Robert Gordy, 91, music publishing executive and recording artist
October 23 – Don Edwards, 86, western singer
October 24 – Gregg Philbin, 74, rock bassist
October 25 – 
Paul Stoddard, 51, metalcore singer 
Jules Bass, 87, lyricist
October 28 – 
Jerry Lee Lewis, 87, rock and roll singer
D.H. Peligro, 63, punk rock drummer
October 30 – Anthony Ortega, 94, jazz clarinetist
October 31 – Patrick Hagerty, 78, country singer
November 1 – 
Takeoff, 28, rapper (Migos)
Joseph Tarsia, 88, recording engineer and studio owner  
November 5 – 
Aaron Carter, 34, pop  singer
Mimi Parker, 55, indie rock singer and drummer (Low)
Tame One, 52, rapper
November 6 – Hurricane G, 52, rapper
November 7 – Jeff Cook, 73, country musician (Alabama)
November 12 – Gene Cipriano, 94, jazz and pop woodwindist 
November 16 – Mick Goodrick, 77, jazz guitarist
November 17 – B. Smyth, 28, R&B singer
November 18 – Ned Rorem, 99, classical composer
November 19 – Danny Kalb, 80, blues guitarist (The Blues Project)
November 25 – 
Irene Cara, 63, singer
Charles Koppelman, 82, record executive (SBK Records)
Don Newkirk, 56, film composer and record producer
November 26 – Louise Tobin, 104, jazz singer
December 4 – Bob McGrath, 90, musician
December 5 – Jim Stewart, 92, record producer (Stax Records)
December 10 – J. J. Barnes, 79, R&B singer
December 11 – Angelo Badalamenti, 85, composer and arranger
December 13 – Stephen "tWitch" Boss, 40, DJ and dancer
December 15 – Dino Danelli, 78, rock drummer (The Young Rascals)
December 16 – Charlie Gracie, 86, rock and roll singer
December 22 – Big Scarr, 22, rapper
December 31 – Anita Pointer, 74, singer, songwriter (The Pointer Sisters)
Jeremiah Green, 45, indie rock drummer (Modest Mouse)

See also
2022 in music

References

2022 in American music